Ardys or Ardysus may refer to:
 Ardys of Lydia, 7th century BC, second Mermnad king of Lydia 
 Ardys (general), commander under Antiochus the Great